Mohamed Lagili (born 27 May 1997) is a Tunisian swimmer. He competed in the men's 200 metre freestyle event at the 2017 World Aquatics Championships. In 2019, he represented Tunisia at the 2019 African Games held in Rabat, Morocco.

References

External links
 

1997 births
Living people
Tunisian male freestyle swimmers
Place of birth missing (living people)
Swimmers at the 2014 Summer Youth Olympics
African Games gold medalists for Tunisia
African Games silver medalists for Tunisia
African Games medalists in swimming
Swimmers at the 2015 African Games
Swimmers at the 2019 African Games
21st-century Tunisian people
Mediterranean Games competitors for Tunisia
Swimmers at the 2018 Mediterranean Games
Swimmers at the 2022 Mediterranean Games